The 2018 Dollar General Bowl was a college football bowl game played on December 22, 2018. It was the 20th edition of the Dollar General Bowl, and one of the 2018–19 bowl games concluding the 2018 FBS football season. The game was sponsored by the Dollar General chain of variety stores.

Teams
The game was played between teams from the Mid-American Conference (MAC) and the Sun Belt Conference.

Troy Trojans

On November 29, college football news organizations reported that Troy would play in the Dollar General Bowl, which was confirmed via an official announcement on December 2. The Trojans entered the bowl with a 10–3 record (7–1 in conference). This was Troy's third consecutive bowl appearance, following victories in the 2016 Dollar General Bowl and 2017 New Orleans Bowl.

Buffalo Bulls

Buffalo received and accepted a bid to the Dollar General Bowl on December 2. The Bulls had a 10–3 record on the year (7–1 in conference), losing to Northern Illinois in the MAC Championship Game. This was Buffalo's third bowl appearance, after losses in the 2009 International Bowl and 2013 Famous Idaho Potato Bowl.

Game summary

Scoring summary

Statistics

Notes

References

External links
 Box score at ESPN
 2018 Dollar General Bowl Highlights via YouTube

Dollar General Bowl
LendingTree Bowl
Buffalo Bulls football bowl games
Troy Trojans football bowl games
Dollar General Bowl
Dollar General Bowl